William Earl Buckler (April 29, 1901 – June 20, 1979) was a professional American football player who played guard for six seasons for the Chicago Bears.

1901 births
1979 deaths
American football offensive guards
Alabama Crimson Tide football players
Chicago Bears players
Players of American football from Saint Paul, Minnesota
All-Southern college football players